The Parthe is a river in Saxony, Germany, right tributary of the White Elster. The Parthe originates in northern Saxony, between Colditz and Bad Lausick. It flows northwest through Parthenstein, Naunhof, Borsdorf and Taucha before entering the city of Leipzig. The Parthe joins the White Elster in northwestern Leipzig.

Course 

On its course through the Leipzig Bay (Leipziger Tieflandsbucht), the Parthe flows through the regions and towns of Großbardau, Parthenstein, Naunhof, Beucha, Borsdorf, Panitzsch, Taucha and Leipzig. Into the Parthe flow, amongst others, the Gladegraben, the Lazy Parthe, the Todgraben, the Mittelgraben, the Grenzgraben, the Threne, the Zauchgraben, the Kittelgraben, the Wachtelbach, the Lösegraben, the Staditzbach, the Hasengraben and the Rüdgengraben. Over the years numerous straightenings and canalisations have had an effect on the river. By the time the Parthe reaches Leipzig the stony river bed is visible.

Name 
Amongst others, the region Parthenstein and the motorway junction  Parthenaue (the merging of the A 38 into the A 14 motorway) are called after the river.

Flooding 2002 
During the 100-year flood of the Elbe in 2002, the Parthe also broke its banks. This led to damage in villages and towns such as Kleinbardau and Großbardau.

Recreation and Nature 

It is part of  network of cycling routes, which run from Leipzig to the Freiberger Mulde as well as to the river Elbe.

Large sections of the river's course are designated as the "Nature reserve Parthenaue - Machern".

See also 
 Leipzig River Network

Rivers of Saxony
Rivers of Germany